Morrisson may refer to:

People
Morrisson (rapper)
Morrisson (singer)
Andrew Morrisson, a British classical organist
Cécile Morrisson, a French historian and numismatist
Mary Foulke Morrisson, an American suffragist and social activist

See also
Morrisson v Robertson, a case establishing the common law principles that govern unilateral error in Scots law
Morrison (disambiguation)